Henry Harrison Ford (March 11, 1844 - September 23, 1887) was a member of the Texas House from 1873 to 1874.

Life
He was born on March 11, 1844, in Mississippi to David Ford and Maria Van Dyke Hamilton. He married Eugenia Rebecca Stark on May 9, 1867. They had 5 children born between 1868 and 1879. He died on September 23, 1887, at the age of 43.

Politics
He served in the Texas House from 1873 to 1874.

References

1844 births
1887 deaths
Members of the Texas House of Representatives
19th-century American politicians